Yvette Maree D'Ath (born 26 July 1970) is an Australian politician. She is a Labor member of the Legislative Assembly of Queensland representing the seat of Redcliffe. D'Ath is currently the Minister for Health and Ambulance Services and Leader of the House. She was previously a Labor member of the Australian House of Representatives representing the outer Brisbane seat of Petrie from 2007 to 2013.

Education and early career
D'Ath graduated from the Queensland University of Technology with a Bachelor of Laws, followed by a Graduate Diploma in Legal Practice from the Australian National University. After working as a waitress, she was appointed an associate to the Queensland Industrial Relations Commission, serving between 1992 and 1994. She then became a senior industrial advocate for the Australian Workers' Union in Queensland.

Federal politics
D'Ath won the seat of Petrie for Labor from Liberal Teresa Gambaro at the 2007 election with a 2-point margin from a 9.5-point swing, before increasing it to 2.5 points at the 2010 election. D'Ath was narrowly defeated by 0.5 points at the 2013 election.

Following the promotion of Mark Dreyfus as Attorney-General in February 2013, D'Ath was promoted to replace some of Dreyfus' responsibilities as Parliamentary Secretary for Climate Change and Energy Efficiency. Her responsibilities were altered and she became Parliamentary Secretary for Climate Change, Industry, and Innovation in a rearrangement of the Second Gillard Ministry on 25 March 2013.

State politics
In December 2013, D'Ath was preselected to contest the state seat of Redcliffe at the 2014 by-election. The seat of Redcliffe covered much of the same area as her former federal seat of Petrie. She won the seat with a 17.2-point two-party swing to Labor. This increased Labor's representation in the Queensland Parliament from seven to eight seats. After the by-election victory D'Ath was made the Shadow Minister for Education and Training, Disability Services, Science, IT and Innovation.

On 27 August 2014, D'Ath was made the Shadow Attorney-General, the Shadow Minister for Justice and the Shadow Minister for Training, Disability Services and Housing after a reshuffle prompted by the Labor victory in the Stafford by-election.

Palaszczuk government
After Labor's victory in the 2015 Queensland State Election, D'Ath was sworn in as Attorney-General, Minister for Justice and Minister for Training and Skills in the Palaszczuk Ministry on 16 February 2015.

Following the 2017 Queensland State Election, in which the Palaszczuk government was returned with a majority, D'Ath retained her position as Attorney-General and Minister for Justice.

D'Ath retained her seat of Redcliffe in the 2020 Queensland state election, becoming the Minister for Health and Ambulance Services. She was succeeded as Attorney-General and Minister for Justice by Shannon Fentiman.

See also
First Palaszczuk Ministry
Second Palaszczuk Ministry
Third Palaszczuk Ministry

References

External links
Official website

1970 births
Living people
Attorneys-General of Queensland
Members of the Queensland Legislative Assembly
Members of the Australian House of Representatives for Petrie
Members of the Australian House of Representatives
Australian Labor Party members of the Parliament of Australia
Labor Right politicians
Queensland University of Technology alumni
Australian National University alumni
Women members of the Australian House of Representatives
Australian Labor Party members of the Parliament of Queensland
21st-century Australian politicians
21st-century Australian women politicians
Women members of the Queensland Legislative Assembly